Metal Trades Department of the AFL-CIO is a trade department of the AFL–CIO. It was founded June 15, 1908.

Presidents
1908: James O'Connell
1935: John P. Frey
1951: James A. Brownlow
1962: B. A. Gritta
1969: Maywood Boggs
1971: Paul Burnsky
1994: John Meese
2002: Ronald Ault
2016: James Hart

References

External links
Metal Trades Department of the AFL–CIO

AFL–CIO
Metal trade unions

Trade unions established in 1908
1908 establishments in the United States